The following lists events that happened during 1908 in South Africa.

Incumbents
 Governor of the Cape of Good Hope and High Commissioner for Southern Africa:Walter Hely-Hutchinson.
 Governor of the Colony of Natal: Matthew Nathan.
 Prime Minister of the Cape of Good Hope: Leander Starr Jameson.
 Prime Minister of the Colony of Natal: Frederick Robert Moor.
 Prime Minister of the Orange River Colony: Hamilton John Goold-Adams.
 Prime Minister of the Transvaal Colony: Louis Botha.

Events
January
 30 – Mahatma Gandhi is released from prison by Jan Smuts after having been tried and sentenced to 2 months in prison earlier in the month.

March
 4 – The Pretoria branch of the Transvaal University College, precursor to the University of Pretoria, is established.

October
 7 – Mahatma Gandhi is arrested in Volksrust, along with fifteen other Indians, for entering Transvaal without registration certificates and is sentenced to two months imprisonment with hard labor.

Unknown date
 Bosman de Ravelli composes the first Afrikaans art song

Births
 5 March – Arthur Wegelin, composer.
 23 April – Bram Fischer, lawyer and champion against apartheid, is born in the Orange River Colony. (d. 1975)
 2 July – Andries Johannes Bester de Klerk, writer and secretary of the Cape Province, is born in Williston, Cape Colony
 10 July – Wally Hayward, South African athlete (d. 2006)

Deaths

Railways

Railway lines opened

 4 January – Cape Eastern – West Bank, Buffalo Harbour to Chiselhurst, .
 6 February – Transvaal – Machadodorp to Breyten, .
 8 April – Free State – Hamilton to Beaconsfield (Cape), .
 28 May – Cape Western – Milnerton to Ascot, .
 3 June – Natal – Esperanza to Donnybrook (Narrow gauge), .

Locomotives
 The Cape Government Railways places two 4-6-2 Pacific type narrow gauge tank steam locomotives in passenger service on the Walmer branch in Port Elizabeth.

References

 
South Africa
Years in South Africa